Sugarcreek Township may refer to:

 Sugarcreek Township, Greene County, Ohio
 Sugarcreek Township, Armstrong County, Pennsylvania

See also 
 Sugar Creek Township (disambiguation)

 Township name disambiguation pages